The Junior Eurovision Song Contest 2003 was the inaugural edition of the annual Junior Eurovision Song Contest for young singers aged eight to fifteen. It was held on 15 November 2003, in Copenhagen, Denmark.

It was the first Eurovision contest to be broadcast in the 16:9 widescreen and high definition, but was also offered to broadcasters in the traditional 4:3 aspect ratio. It was also the first Eurovision Song Contest where a DVD of the contest would be released. It was decided that the country that won the contest would not necessarily host the next contest, to reduce the pressure on the contestants. It was announced before the contest took place that the next edition would be held in the United Kingdom (although in the end this did not happen).

Origins and history 

The origins of the contest date back to 2000 when Danmarks Radio held a song contest for Danish children that year and the following year. The idea was extended to a Scandinavian song competition in 2002, known as MGP Nordic, with Denmark, Norway and Sweden as participants. The EBU picked up the idea for a song contest featuring children and opened the competition to all EBU member broadcasters making it a pan-European event. The working title of the programme was "Eurovision Song Contest for Children", branded with the name of the EBU's long-running and already popular song competition, the Eurovision Song Contest.

Location 

Denmark was asked to host the first programme after their experience with their own contests and the MGP Nordic. Copenhagen was confirmed as the host city in November 2002. In January 2003, it was announced that the Danish broadcaster would host the inaugural contest at the 8,000 capacity Forum venue in the Danish capital.

Venue

Forum Copenhagen is a large multi-purpose, rentable indoor arena located in Frederiksberg, Copenhagen, Denmark. It hosts a large variety of concerts, markets, exhibitions and other events. The venue can hold up to 10,000 people depending on the event. The Forum operates as a convention center, concert hall and indoor arena.

It was opened in February 1926 to host a car exhibition and was last renovated in 1996–97. Over two storeys there is a combined exhibition floor area of 5,000 m2 and a separate restaurant for up to 250 seated guests. The Metro station Forum is adjacent to the building. Forum Copenhagen was designed by Oscar Gundlach-Pedersen, and the lighting was from Poul Henningsen's brand new PH-lamp. In 1929 it held an architecture exhibition, which was one of the first presentations of functionalism in Denmark, namely the Housing and Building Exhibition in Forum. It was at this exhibition that Arne Jacobsen and Flemming Lassen exhibited their subscription to the cylindrical "House of the Future".

Format

Presenters
In February 2003, there was speculation regarding the potential host of the first ever Eurovision Song Contest for Children. Initially, the European Broadcasting Union (EBU), the organizer of the show, announced the possible allocation of this role to Irish vocalist and Eurovision Song Contest 1997 co-host Ronan Keating although no contract had yet been signed. On 10 October 2003, however, it was officially announced that the contest would be hosted by the Danish duo consisting of Camilla Ottesen and rapper Remee.

Running order
The draw for the running order of the contest was held on 6 October at Radiohuset, with Greece drawn to open the contest and the Netherlands drawn to close.

Voting
All countries used televoting to decide on their top ten. In normal Eurovision fashion, each country's favourite song was given 12 points, their second favourite 10, and their third to tenth favourites were given 8–1 points.

Opening and interval acts
The opening number was performed by Fu:el and Dance Faction, although this was not included in televised broadcast. The halftime entertainment was provided by two acts from the UK. Busted performed "Crashed the Wedding" but Charlie Simpson was absent due to illness. However, the following day he was present for a radio interview in the UK where it was implied by both himself and the other band members, that this was, in fact, a lie. The real reason for his absence was that he hated Eurovision. The Sugababes performed "Hole in the Head".

Postcards
The postcards featured all of the participants (and their backing dancers/singers) exploring different parts of Copenhagen. The postcard's audio would be an instrumental version of the opening theme. The following list shows the various places they visited:

 The Tivoli Gardens
 Forum Copenhagen
 Royal Danish Theatre
 Danish Aquarium
 Strøget
 Copenhagen Lakes
 A hotel in Copenhagen
 Hairdressers in Copenhagen
 Parken
 
 Copenhagen Skatepark
 Copenhagen Zoo
 A hotdog stand in Copenhagen
 The Round Tower
 A riding school in Copenhagen
 An internet café in Copenhagen

Participating countries
16 countries competed in the first edition of the Junior Eurovision Song Contest. In an original press release for the contest, then entitled the "Eurovision Song Contest for Children", a draw was held to select 15 countries to take part in the inaugural contest, with Slovakian broadcaster Slovenská televízia (STV) and German broadcaster ARD being drawn to compete along with 13 other countries.

The Finnish broadcaster Yle also expressed a debut in the first contest, but went on to just broadcast it instead.

Participants and results

Detailed voting results

12 points 
Below is a summary of the maximum 12 points each country awarded to another:

Spokespersons 

 Chloe Sofia Boleti
  TBC
  TBC
  TBC
 David Daurins
  TBC
  TBC
  TBC
 Jimmy Castro
  TBC
 Judith Bussé
 Sasha Stevens
  TBC
 Siri Lindgren	
  TBC
  Aisa

Other countries 
For a country to be eligible for potential participation in the Junior Eurovision Song Contest, it needs to be an active member of the EBU. It is currently unknown whether the EBU issue invitations of participation to all 56 active members like they do for the Eurovision Song Contest.

 Finnish broadcaster Yle expressed an interest in participating in the contest. However, it was unsuccessful and they went on to broadcast it instead.
 The EBU announced that they would hold a draw to determine which countries would participate in the contest. German broadcaster KiKa was one of the countries drawn. However, they announced their withdrawal from the contest and went on to broadcast it instead. Germany wouldn't debut at Junior Eurovision until 2020.
 After Germany and Slovakia withdrew, the EBU sent an invitation to Irish broadcaster Raidió Teilifís Éireann (RTÉ) who then submitted preliminary applications, but in the end declined to participate or broadcast the contest. Ireland did, however, debut with TG4 as the broadcaster in 2015.
 The EBU also sent an invitation to the Israel Broadcasting Authority (IBA), but they declined to participate and also did not broadcast it. Ireland and Israel would later be replaced by Poland and Belarus, who received the final spot.
 Slovakian broadcaster Slovenská televízia (STV), along with KiKa, was drawn to participate in the contest, however declined to participate and did not broadcast the show either.

Broadcasts 

The rights to broadcast the contest were also acquired by broadcasters in Iceland (RÚV), Finland (Yle), Serbia and Montenegro (RTS/RTCG), Estonia (ETV), Germany (KI.KA), Australia (SBS) and Kosovo (RTK). Some of the participating broadcasters also transmitted the programme live on radio.

Official album

Junior Eurovision Song Contest: Copenhagen 2003, is a compilation album put together by the European Broadcasting Union, and was released by Universal Music Group in November 2003. The album features all the songs from the 2003 contest. On the track list Cyprus was misspelt as Cypres.

See also
 European Broadcasting Union
 Eurovision Song Contest 2003
 Junior Eurovision Song Contest

References

External links

 
2003
2003 in Copenhagen
2003 song contests
2003 in Denmark
November 2003 events in Europe
Events in Copenhagen